Mollia is a genus of flowering plants belonging to the family Malvaceae. It is within the Grewioideae subfamily, and the Grewieae tribe.

Description

They have 3-veined from the base leaves which have serrated, toothed (dentate) or smooth margins. The indumentum (surface covering) has stellate hairs and pelate scales.  They have rudimentary (or small) stipules (a small appendage at the bases of leaves), which are caducous (fall off early).

It has inflorescences in few- to many flowered units, sometimes on a common peduncle (stalk), or solitary flowers. They are showy and white. The sepals are narrow with the petals being truncate and glandless.  The stamens are numerous, in 2 whorls each of 5 phalanges with basally fused filaments (stamen stalks), the outer whorl is antesepalous and longer than the inner.

The anthers are introrse (with opening toward the centre of flower), subasifixed, diamorphic (having two different forms), in outer whorl they are cordate at base and in the inner whorl, they are sagittate (arrow-head shaped).

The ovary is 2 locular, or incompletely so. The ovules are 2 seriate (arranged in rows) in each locule and numerous. The style is filiform (needle-like) and the stigma is punctiform (dot-like). The capsule is also loculicidal (splits along an edge), globose or compressed contrary to the septum and sometimes winged along the line of dehiscence (splitting edge). The loculi, each with two rows of 8–20 flattened seeds and fitting between narrow membranous partitions.

The seeds are short winged, various per fruit, plants pubescent. The embryo (inside the seed) is flat, endosperm copious and oily.

Taxonomy
The genus name of Mollia is in honour of Karl von Moll (1760–1838), an Austrian naturalist and statesman. The genus was first described and published in Nov. Gen. Sp. Pl. Bras. Vol.1 on page 96 in 1826.

The genus is recognized by the United States Department of Agriculture and the Agricultural Research Service, but they do not list any known species.

In the 1800's the genus was once placed within the family Tiliaceae, It was returned in the Malvales family in 1935.

It was placed within Grewioidaee subfamily due to molecular data (phospholipase gene) Blatter (unpulished source), but another author, Meijer thought it to be related to the Trichospermum genus due to similar capsule shapes.

The genus has been studied in 2021 and the various synonyms have been determined.

Range and habitat
Its native range is southern Tropical America, and it is found in Bolivia, (northern, north-eastern and west central) Brazil, Colombia, Ecuador, Guyana, Peru and Venezuela.

It is found in the savannah forests of Cerrado, Brazil.

Known species
about 18 species known, 
According to Kew:

Mollia glabrescens  and Mollia nitida  are listed by IUCN as 'Vulnerable'.

References

Flora of Bolivia
Flora of North Brazil
Flora of Northeast Brazil
Flora of West-Central Brazil
Grewioideae
Malvaceae genera
plants described in 1826